Mark Alexander Terrance Pysyk (born January 11, 1992) is a Canadian professional ice hockey defenceman and forward for the Detroit Red Wings of the National Hockey League (NHL). Pysyk was originally selected in the first round, 23rd overall, in the 2010 NHL Entry Draft by the Buffalo Sabres.

Personal life
Pysyk was born on January 11, 1992, to Ukrainian parents Sherry and Terry. His mother is a nurse at University of Alberta Hospitals and his father is a vice-principal. Born in Edmonton, Pysyk and his family moved to Sherwood Park while he was in the third grade. As such, Pysyk played his minor hockey in the Sherwood Park program.

Playing career

Amateur
While competing in the Alberta Major Bantam Hockey League (AMBHL) for the 2006–07 season with the Strathcona Warriors, Pysyk recorded 15 goals and 49 points in 33 games and was the co-recipient of the league's top defenceman award. At the age of 15, Pysyk became the first-ever draft pick of the current incarnation of the Edmonton Oil Kings when he was selected third overall in the 2007 Western Hockey League (WHL) Bantam Draft. Due to his age, he would only be able to play with the team as an affiliate player for the 2007–08 season. He began the season with the AMBHL but was told by Oil Kings head coach Steve Pleau he would make his WHL debut after the Christmas break. Pysyk subsequently made his debut on December 28, 2007, against the Red Deer Rebels. In his second game since being called up from Midget AAA, Pysyk was working with the powerplay unit and recorded his first WHL assist.

Pysyk recorded his first career WHL goal on March 8, 2008, in a 4–1 loss to the Brandon Wheat Kings, helping the team maintain their 20–37-4 record. After concluding his first full season with the Oil Kings, Pysyk was the recipient of two team end-of-year awards: Rookie of the Year and Defenceman of the Year.

Pysyk returned to the Oil Kings for the 2009–10 season, where the team had the second-fewest points in the league. He played 48 games before being sidelined with a broken foot but still ended the season eighth on the team in scoring. His efforts were recognized by Oil Kings GM Bob Green, who said: "He carried our team on his back a lot of nights this winter, and the fact that he played on a broken foot for a couple of games before he was forced to end his season early shows how much character he's developed." At the end of the season, Pysyk was ranked seventh among North American skaters for the 2010 NHL Entry Draft by the NHL Central Scouting Bureau. He was eventually selected in the first round, 23rd overall, by the Buffalo Sabres. Following his draft, Sabres' director of amateur scouting proposed Pysyk would need three years before making his NHL debut due to his small stature and light weight. After being returned to his junior team by the Sabres after training camp, Pysyk was named the captain of the Oil Kings on September 28, 2010.

On May 13, 2012, Mark, along with the rest of the Edmonton Oil Kings, won game 7 of the WHL Finals, against the Portland Winter Hawks with a score of 4–1, to win the Ed Chynoweth Cup. They went on to the Memorial Cup in Shawinigan Quebec, and came in 4th.

Professional

In his debut professional season in 2012–13, he marked his first professional game by scoring a goal with the Sabres' AHL affiliate, the Rochester Americans, on October 12, 2012. After 57 games with the Americans, Pysyk received his first NHL call-up by Buffalo midway into the shortened season. He played his first NHL game on March 17, 2013 against the Washington Capitals.

On June 25, 2016, Pysyk was traded, along with picks 38 and 89 in the 2016 NHL Draft to the Florida Panthers in exchange for pick 33 in the 2016 draft and defenceman Dmitri Kulikov.

In the 2019–20 season, Pysyk began the season on the blueline often in a bottom pairing role. With the depth on the Panthers defense, he was also used at the right wing at times throughout the season and responded offensively scoring his first NHL hat trick, tallying three goals on three shots to rally the Panthers to victory from a 3–1 deficit on February 3, 2020. He set career highs by posting nine goals and 18 points in 58 regular-season games played for Florida.

On October 11, 2020, Pysyk signed a one-year, $750,000 contract with the Dallas Stars. In the pandemic delayed  season, Pysyk struggled to find his role within Dallas, recording just three goals and four points through 36 games in the shortened season.

Leaving the Stars after one season, Pysyk returned to his original club, the Buffalo Sabres, agreeing to a one-year, $900,000 contract on July 28, 2021. During the  season her recorded three goals and nine assists in 68 games for the Sabres.

On July 14, 2022, Pysyk signed a one-year, $850,000 contract with the Detroit Red Wings. Shortly after he was acquired by the Red Wings, Pysyk was announced by the club that he would miss the beginning of the  season after he suffered an Achilles Tendon tear and underwent surgery with a recovery timetable of 4–6 months.

International play

Pysyk was invited to take part in Canada's 2011 National Junior Team selection camp, but did not make the final roster. The following year, he was named to the team for the 2012 World Junior Championships, held in Alberta.

Career statistics

Regular season and playoffs

International

References

External links

1992 births
Living people
Buffalo Sabres draft picks
Buffalo Sabres players
Canadian ice hockey defencemen
Canadian people of Ukrainian descent
Dallas Stars players
Edmonton Oil Kings players
Florida Panthers players
National Hockey League first-round draft picks
Rochester Americans players
Sherwood Park Crusaders players
Ice hockey people from Edmonton